Stretch is the surname of:

Bill Stretch (born 1935), Australian former politician
Billy Stretch (born 1996), Australian rules footballer
C.J. Stretch (born 1989), American ice hockey player
Charles Lennox Stretch (1797–1882), South African politician
Gary Stretch (born 1965), English actor, former boxer and former model
Jack Stretch (1855–1919), Australian Anglican bishop
Joe Stretch (born 1982), English writer
John Stretch (disambiguation)
Peter Stretch (1670–1746), American clockmaker
Richard Stretch (1952–2014), South African cricketer
Rudy Stretch (born 1999), American soccer player
Steven Stretch (born 1964), former Australian rules footballer
Thomas Stretch (1697–1765), American clockmaker, son of Peter Stretch
Thomas James Stretch (1915–1973), British Army chaplain

See also
Stretch (nickname)